The Chaba River is a short river in western Alberta, Canada. It flows from the Canadian Rockies, and joins the Athabasca River.

The Chaba River is a major tributary of the Athabasca.  The Chaba is fed by the glacial melt originating in the Chaba Icefield, comprising Chaba Peak, as well as Listening and Sundial Peaks.  A small glacier on Mount Quincy also contributes to the Chaba. The river was given its name by A. P. Coleman, a geologist born in Eastern Canada in 1852.  He stated there "were endless beaver dams and trees" along the river, and named it after the Stoney Indian word for beavers."

See also
List of Alberta rivers

References

Rivers of Alberta